Further is the debut studio album by the Scottish indie rock band Geneva. It was released on 9 June 1997 and reached number twenty on the UK Albums Chart. Further includes the singles "No One Speaks", "Into the Blue", "Tranquillizer" and "Best Regrets".

The band recorded the songs for album with Mike Hedges in between 1996 and 1997. Receiving positive reviews the album was originally released as a CD, Cassette and LP on 9 June 1997 by Nude Records. The artwork was designed by Struktur design with photography by Steve Niedorf and Harry Borden.

Track listing
All songs written by Andrew Montgomery and Steven Dora, except where noted.
 "Temporary Wings" - 3:13     
 "Into the Blue" (Montgomery, Stuart Evans, Keith Graham) - 3:24     
 "The God of Sleep" - 3:05     
 "Best Regrets" - 4:05     
 "Tranquillizer" (Montgomery, Graham) - 3:31     
 "Further" - 4:52      
 "No One Speaks" - 3:35      
 "Worry Beads" - 4:48      
 "Fall Apart Button" (Montgomery, Graham) - 3:12     
 "Wearing Off" - 3:31     
 "Nature's Whore" - 3:20      
 "In the Years Remaining" - 5:18

Personnel
Andrew Montgomery - Vocals
Steven Dora - Guitar
Keith Graham - Bass
Stuart Evans - Guitar
Douglas Caskie - Drums

Additional musicians
Gini Ball
Sian Bell
Dinah Beamish
Sally Herbert
Clare Orsler
Jocelyn Pook
Anne Stephenson

References

Geneva (band) albums
1997 debut albums
Albums produced by Mike Hedges